Zavidovo is a rural locality (a village) in Yugskoye Rural Settlement, Cherepovetsky District, Vologda Oblast, Russia. The population was 22 as of 2002.

Geography 
Zavidovo is located 64 km southeast of Cherepovets (the district's administrative centre) by road. Maslovo is the nearest rural locality.

References 

Rural localities in Cherepovetsky District